Jazz Live At Soup Plus is a compilation album of jazz music released through 2MBS's Jazz label. It was recorded at Soup Plus Restaurant (A1-3, B1-2) and Sydney Town Hall (B3). The album was nominated for 1989 ARIA Award for Best Jazz Album.

Track listing

 Rhyth-a-ming - Bernie McGann Quartet
 Turquoise - Peter Boothman Quartet
 Some Day My Prince Will Come - Tom Baker Quartet

 Memories Of You - Tom Baker Quartet
 My Funny Valentine - Bruce Johnson Quartet
 Jumping At The Woodside - Dick Hughes' Famous Five

References

Compilation albums by Australian artists
Jazz albums by Australian artists